The Lovers of Cluj-Napoca are a pair of human skeletons discovered in 2013 by archaeologists in the cemetery of a former Dominican convent in Cluj-Napoca, Romania. The couple are believed to have lived between 1450 and 1550 – between the year the convent was established and the year the graveyard was secularised. Analysis by archaeologists confirmed that the skeletons belong to a man and a woman around 30 years of age. The couple were buried facing each other, and with their hands interlocked.

The male appears to have died due to a fight or an accident as his sternum is broken, possibly caused by a blow from a blunt object. Another archaeologist places the blame for the man's death on a broken hip. The cause of death of the female is unclear from her skeleton. It is unlikely that she committed suicide, as that was considered a sin at the time and would have excluded her from being buried in consecrated ground.

See also 
Institute of Archaeology and Art History, Cluj-Napoca
Lovers of Modena
Lovers of Valdaro
Embracing Skeletons of Alepotrypa
Lovers of Teruel

References 

Archaeology of death
Archaeology of Romania
Couples
History of Cluj-Napoca
Human remains (archaeological)
Skeletons
Unsolved deaths